Vadim Yurievich Andreyev (born 30 March 1958) is a Soviet and Russian film and theater actor.

Biography 
Vadim Andreyev was born in Moscow, Russian SFSR, Soviet Union. Since 1975 he worked as fitter in the Moscow Puppet Theater, and later became an actor. After graduating in 1979 VGIK, Vadim Andreyev worked on Gorky Film Studio. In 1979-1981 he served in the army.

His film career began with major roles in auteur  Vladimir Rogovoy's films Balamut in 1978 and The Sailors Are No Questions in 1980.

Until 2011, Vadim Andreyev took an active part in dubbing foreign animated films. Prior to 2007, also voiced commercials.

He is married and raised a son named Andrey. In 2013, the granddaughter Sophia was born.

Selected filmography 
 1978 —  Balamut as Pyotr Antonovich Gorokhov
 1980 —  Karl Marx. Youth as archivist
1980 —  Sailors Have No Questions as Sanya Fokin
1981 —  Carnival as Vadim Arturovich, director of amateur theater
1981 —  The Driver for a Voyage as Sanya
 1982 —  White Shaman as  Zhuravlev
 1982 —  Married Bachelor as Sergey Antipov
 1984 —  TASS Is Authorized to Declare... as Dronov, KGB lieutenant
 1985 —  The Battalions are Asked to Fire as Derevianko
 1992 — Black Square as Arthur Krasnikovsky
 1993 — Stalin's Testament as militia's colonel  
 2004 — Children of the Arbat as Baulin
 2005 — Carmelita as Fors
 2012/2014 — Moscow. Three Station as Grigory Somov
 2013 — Molodezhka as  Fyodor Mikhailovich
 2015 — Must Alpinist as militia's chief
 2019 — Saving Leningrad as  Skvortsov
 2020 — White Snow as Pyotr
 2021 — Champion of the World as football commentator

References

External links
 

1958 births
Living people
Soviet male film actors
Soviet male television actors
Soviet male voice actors
Soviet male stage actors
Russian male film actors
Russian male television actors
Russian male voice actors
Russian male stage actors
Male actors from Moscow
20th-century Russian male actors
21st-century Russian male actors
Gerasimov Institute of Cinematography alumni